The Korail Class 351000 trains, formerly identified as Korail Class 2000 trains, are commuter electric multiple units in South Korea used on Suin-Bundang Line. Class 351000 trains were manufactured and delivered between 1993.

Technical details

Formation
The Class 351000 cars are arranged in 6-car trains. Details of the car types of each train are listed below:

3510XX (ex-20XX) - Tc (trailer driving car with SIV, air compressor, and battery)
3511XX (ex-22XX) - M (motor car with inverter and controller)
3512XX (ex-23XX) - M' (motor car with pantograph, transformer, inverter, and controller)
3513XX (ex-24XX) - T (trailer car) 
3514XX (ex-25XX) - M'
3519XX (ex-21XX) - Tc

Electrical parts 
Trains 351-09, 351-11~351-12, 351-14, 351-17~351-18, and 351-20~351-28 use Toshiba GTO-based VVVF controls with active cooling, while all other trains use IGBT controls with passive cooling through a heat pipe. The trains are equipped with regenerative braking, reducing energy consumption and simplifying train inspection. The trains feature a more powerful air conditioning system than that on the Class 1000 trains.

Interior design 
The 1st and 2nd generation Class 351000 trains used an ivory-colored interior with a long sheet prior to their overhauls. All 1st and 2nd generation trains, as well as subsequent generation, use a white interior. LED display monitors are installed on the top of each car. The end cars have a space for wheelchairs.

Cabin 
The Class 351000 trains equipped with TGIS use color displays, and service machines can be automatically controlled in TGIS after a refurbishment of these trains in 2005. Dead section notifiers are also installed.

Depot 
Most of the Class 351000 trains are stored at the Bundang Depot, which is located between Jukjeon Station and Bojeong Station. The remaining other Class 351000 trains are stored at the Siheung Depot, which is located between Oido Station and Darwol Station.

Generations

1st generation 

The first generation of Class 351000 trains were built from 1993 to 1999 by Daewoo Heavy Industries and Hanjin Heavy Industries. Because of the flat front ends, the trains are nicknamed "flat face" (납작이).

The trains are numbered 351-01~351-22; the trains were renumbered from trains 2-47~2-48, 2-50, 2-55~2-69, and 2-73~2-76.

Trains 351-01~351-18 were manufactured from 1993 to 1995 by Daewoo Heavy Industries and Hanjin Heavy Industries to address the opening of the Bundang Line from Suseo station to Ori station. Meanwhile, trains 351-19~351-22 were manufactured in 1999 by Hanjin Heavy Industries to expand the rolling stock on Bundang Line.

2nd generation 

The second generation of Class 351000 trains were built in 2003 by ROTEM (Railroading Technology System) to address the extension of the Suin-Bundang Line from Suseo station to Seolleung station. The car body as a whole was redesigned; the cab ends of the driving cars were changed completely, and the side windows are now coated and in a single piece (as opposed to the two-window setup between doors). Because of the circular front view, the trains are nicknamed "round face" (동글이).

The trains are numbered 351-23~351-28.

3rd generation 

The third generation Class 351000 trains were built from 2011 to 2017 by Hyundai Rotem to address numerous extensions of the Suin-Bundang Line. The front ends have been updated once again, and the trains feature snake-like headlights, giving the trains the nickname "뱀눈이" (roughly translated as "snake eyes"). The interior was also updated, and the door motors are now electric-powered as opposed to air-powered. The third generation trains operating on the Suin-Bundang Line are numbered 351-29~351-43,and 351-61~351-78.

Trains 351-29~351-33 and 351-61~351-68 were manufactured in 2011 to address the extension of the Suin-Bundang Line from Bojeong station to Giheung station. Because the new rebuilt Suin-Bundang Line had not yet opened before the trains were delivered, trains 351-61~351-64 provided additional service on the former Jungang Line when existing trains on the line were suddenly reduced from eight cars to six cars.

Trains 351-34~351-40 were originally manufactured in 2012 to address the extension of the Suin-Bundang Line from Giheung station to Mangpo station. These trains originally used two converted Class 321000 cars per train, but when the Class 321000 trains were re-extended to eight cars per train, the trains were taken out of service until two new cars were created per train in 2014.

Trains 351-41~351-43 and 351-69~351-72 were manufactured in 2013 to address the extension of the Suin-Bundang Line from Mangpo station to Suwon station. They were among the first cars to be delivered with LED headlights.

Trains 351-73~351-78 were manufactured in 2017 to address the final extension of the Suin-Bundang Line, which linked the Bundang Line with the Suin Line. The front ends have been updated once again, and the trains feature updates such as single-arm pantographs (similar to those used on ITX-Saemaeul trains and KTX trains), CCTV cameras, and a third headlight in the same compartment as the destination sign and the run number indicator, giving the trains the nickname "삼눈이" (roughly translated as "3 eyes").

4th generation 

The fourth generation of Class 351000 trains are being built by Hyundai Rotem starting in 2021, likely to replace the aging first generation trains that are nearing the end of their service lifespans. The trains sport some minor changes, such as the change in the propulsion system and a significant change in the design of the end cabs; because of the snout-like appearance, railfans nicknamed the trains "주둥이" (roughly translated as "snout face"). The trains will be delivered in an updated version of the new livery.

At this time, 18 sets, numbered 351-44~351-60 and 351-79, are being manufactured and being delivered between fall 2021 and spring 2023; these sets will serve as replacements for aging first generation Class 351000 trains.

Refurbishment 
The first and second generation Class 351000 trains were overhauled from 2003 to 2005 (though minor refurbishments were started in 2002). Major and minor refurbishments are listed below.

Overhaul 
The Daegu subway fire compelled Korail to introduce flame-resistant interiors for passenger safety. As a result, all first and second generation trains were overhauled with fire-retardant interiors from 2003 to 2005. All third and fourth generation trains were delivered to be fire-retardant from the beginning.

New livery 

All first and second generation trains featured a livery consisting of red and orange stripes. These trains were repainted into a two-tone blue and yellow livery from 2003 to 2005. The new livery has a metaphor of Taegeuk, but was criticized as being too primitive-looking. The livery is applied only on front and on the doors.

Until 2017, trains 351-61~351-72 used a two-tone red and blue livery, the same livery used on Line 1 and Gyeongui-Jungang Line trains.

Electric parts 
 2002: Trains 351-01~351-22 were retrofitted with Comonet broadcasting systems. They have since been removed.
 2003: All 1st generation trains except trains 351-09, 351-11~351-12, 351-14, 351-17~351-18, and 351-20~351-22 had their GTO inverters replaced with IGBT inverters.
 2004: All trains' braking systems are refurbished to generate less noise.
 2004-2005: SIV traction systems were replaced with IGBT traction systems built by Woojin Industrial Systems.
 2005: Various new components in all trains (public address systems, newer cooling systems, and LED destination signs) are added.

From July 2008, all 1st and 2nd generation trains were retrofitted with automatic gangway doors (similar retrofits were also done in Class 311000, Class 321000, and Class 341000 trains). This retrofit included the installation of automatic doors to replace the older doors that were manually pulled open; gangway doors can now be automatically opened by the push of a button. This retrofit process was completed by February 2012.

All trains that were delivered with incandescent headlights are now being retrofitted with LED headlights, following the successful testing of LED headlights on the Korail Class 311000 cars.

Renumbering 
In 2011, the 1st and 2nd generation Class 351000 trains were renumbered from the 2030-series to the 351000-series as a part of a new numbering scheme by Korail (the leading "3" indicating a metro car). Renumbering was finished by mid-2011.

See also 

 Korail
 Bundang Line
 Suin Line
 Korail Class 311000
 Korail Class 341000

References 

Electric multiple units of South Korea
25 kV AC multiple units
1500 V DC multiple units
Hyundai Rotem multiple units